The SAI-Ambrosini SS.4 was an Italian fighter prototype developed in the late 1930s, featuring a canard-style wing layout and a pusher propeller. Development of the SS.4 was abandoned after the prototype crashed on its second flight.

Development
Sergio Stefanutti had already experimented with canard aircraft with the S.C.A. SS.2 and S.C.A. SS.3 Anitra ("Duck"), light aircraft built by Stabilimento Costruzioni Aeronautiche  at Guidonia (a new city focused on aviation). The SS.2 first flew in 1935, and one of the two prototypes was converted into a two-seater with a larger  CNA II engine built by Compagnia Nazionale Aeronautica. This new aircraft first took to the air on 2 October 1937, and was officially revealed in Milan at an international air exposition; the small fixed-undercarriage SS.2 was sent to Passignano sul Trasimeno for evaluation. Experience with this machine and the study of its aerodynamics led Stefanutti to design a canard-style interceptor and air-superiority fighter, designated SS.4, very similar in layout to the SS.2 and SS.3.

Stalling speed was :

A prototype SS.4 was built at the Società Aeronautica Italiana - Ambrosini factory in Passignano sul Trasimeno, Umbria. The first flight took place on 7 March 1939, but in its second flight  next day, the aircraft crashed, killing Ambrosini's chief test pilot Ambrogio Colombo. A second prototype was ordered, but development priority was placed on more easily developed wooden aircraft, and the SS.4 design was abandoned in 1942.

Design
The SS.4 was a single-seat fighter of all-metal construction with a canard configuration wing, with twin fins mounted on the wing trailing edges, retractable tricycle undercarriage, and short fuselage with a rear-mounted engine driving a pusher propeller.

The pilot was accommodated in an enclosed cockpit in the centre of the fuselage forward of the two fuel tanks and aft of the armament in the nose. Visibility from the cockpit was excellent to the sides and front, but restricted to the rear by the large main wing, engine, and large twin fins positioned at roughly the half-span position. Flying controls consisted of elevators on the trailing edges of the canard fore-plane controlling pitch, rudders on the large fins controlling yaw, and ailerons on the main wings to control roll. Pitch trim was set by adjusting a trim tab on the starboard elevator.

The moderately swept, tapered, high-aspect ratio wings had no sweep on the trailing edge and a cut-back to give clearance for the propeller, with the large fins with rudders extending past the trailing edge at the ends of the cut-backs, to ensure enough moment to give adequate control and stability. The delta fore-plane was of low aspect ratio with the elevators sited below the trailing edge similar to the method used by contemporary Junkers aircraft like the Junkers Ju 87.

The engine was a powerful, liquid-cooled Isotta Fraschini Asso XI R.C.40 engine capable of  driving a three-bladed metal propeller. The engine was cooled by two radiators either side of the fuselage in ducts just behind the cockpit. Fuel for the engine was housed in two fuel tanks located mid-fuselage, along with an oil tank.

Armament was to be two  cannon and one  cannon, clustered in the nose.

Operational history

The prototype SS.4 was built by SAI Ambrosini, Passignano sul Trasimeno, and then sent to Eleuteri airport, Castiglione del Lago, also in the Trasimeno area. There, the aircraft was successfully flown for the first time on 7 March 1939. The next day, the SS.4 prototype was scheduled to be transported to Aviano airbase by rail, but Ambrosini's chief test pilot, Ambrogio Colombo, wanted a second test flight. After 45 minutes, an aileron malfunctioned just  from Eleuteri. Colombo attempted to land, but was unable to reach the runway and crashed near Campagna, hitting a tree. Colombo was killed when the engine pushed through the rear bulkhead and crushed him against the front of the cockpit. 

A memorial to Colombo was erected near the site of the crash. The investigation into the crash concluded that the accident was due to imperfect construction, which led to a faulty installation of the aileron that had failed. The study also pointed out the excessive vibrations transmitted by the engine to the wing.

Specifications (SS.4)

See also

References

SAI Ambrosini aircraft
1930s Italian fighter aircraft
Single-engined pusher aircraft
Aircraft first flown in 1939